Lawrence County is the easternmost county in the U.S. state of Illinois. At the 2020 census, the population was 15,280. Its county seat is Lawrenceville.

History
Lawrence County was formed in 1821 out of Crawford and Edwards counties. It was named for Capt. James Lawrence, who was killed in action during the War of 1812 while commanding the frigate . Mortally wounded, he gave his men the famous last order, "Don't give up the ship."

Geography

Climate and weather

Major highways
  U.S. Route 50
  Illinois Route 1
  Illinois Route 33
  Illinois Route 250

Adjacent counties
 Crawford County - north
 Knox County, Indiana - east
 Wabash County - south
 Richland County - west

Demographics

As of the 2010 United States Census, there were 16,833 people, 6,130 households, and 4,056 families living in the county. The racial makeup of the county was 87.3% white, 9.6% black or African American, 0.2% Asian, 0.2% American Indian, 1.7% from other races, and 1.0% from two or more races. Those of Hispanic or Latino origin made up 3.3% of the population. In terms of ancestry, 12.7% were German, 10.4% were American, 9.5% were Irish, and 7.8% were English.

Of the 6,130 households, 28.6% had children under the age of 18 living with them, 50.7% were married couples living together, 10.7% had a female householder with no husband present, 33.8% were non-families, and 30.1% of all households were made up of individuals. The average household size was 2.34 and the average family size was 2.88. The median age was 39.7 years.

The median income for a household in the county was $38,771 and the median income for a family was $45,565. Males had a median income of $40,949 versus $25,991 for females. The per capita income for the county was $19,297. About 14.8% of families and 17.5% of the population were below the poverty line, including 26.9% of those under age 18 and 7.7% of those age 65 or over.

Communities

Cities
 Bridgeport
 Lawrenceville (seat)
 St. Francisville
 Sumner

Village
 Russellville

Unincorporated communities

 Billett
 Birds
 Chauncey
 Petrolia
 Pinkstaff
 Riddleville

Townships 
Nine townships make up Lawrence County. They are:

 Allison
 Bond
 Bridgeport
 Christy
 Denison
 Lawrence
 Lukin
 Petty
 Russell

Politics
In its early days, Lawrence County was a Democratic-leaning swing county, voting Republican only twice up to 1892 when it supported Ulysses S. Grant in 1872 and Benjamin Harrison in 1888. It did not vote for a losing Republican candidate until Wendell Willkie carried the county in 1940 due to isolationist sentiment. Since that time, however, Lawrence County – like so many in Southern Illinois – has become reliably Republican. The only Democrat to gain an absolute majority in the county since 1936 has been Lyndon Johnson in 1964, although Bill Clinton obtained pluralities in both 1992 and 1996.

See also
 National Register of Historic Places listings in Lawrence County, Illinois

References

External links
 Lawrence County official site
 Lawrence County Fact Sheet, Illinois State Archives
 Blue Star Emergency Medical Services Official Site

 
Illinois counties
1821 establishments in Illinois
Populated places established in 1821
Lawrence County, Illinois